Pukwana may refer to:

Pukwana, South Dakota, USA
Pukwana Beach, Wisconsin, USA
Dudu Pukwana (1938–1990), South African saxophonist, composer and pianist